Mildred Holland (April 9, 1869 – January 27, 1944) was an American actress who appeared on stage for more than 35 years.

Holland was born in Chicago and studied under Augustin Daly at the Chicago Conservatory. She made her first appearance in 1890 at Hermann's Bleeker Hall in New York and went on to act in repertory theatre for a good part of her career. On Broadway, she directed and acted in The Lily and the Prince (1911) and The Triumph of an Empress (1911) in addition to acting in Camille (1911) and Tales of Rigo (1927). She also worked in vaudeville. Holland translated plays from French for use in her troupe's productions.

Her first film appearance was in 1912, in the short Two Old Pals with  Otto Breitkreutz.

Outside of the theater and film, Holland was president of the Actors' Church Alliance and vice president of the Professional Women's League besides being active in other organizations.

Her spouse was Edward C. White. She died on January 17, 1944, in New York City.

References

External links

Portrait gallery, NY Public Library Billy Rose collection

1869 births
1944 deaths
Actresses from Chicago
20th-century American actresses
American film actresses
American stage actresses
Broadway theatre directors
Vaudeville performers
19th-century American actresses